Michael Anthony McLaughlin (5 January 1943 – 6 December 2015) was a Welsh footballer who played as a central defender for Nash United, Newport County, Lovell's Athletic, Hereford United and Cheltenham Town. McLaughlin was part of the Hereford United team that famously beat Newcastle United in the FA Cup in 1972.

References

1943 births
2015 deaths
Welsh footballers
Newport County A.F.C. players
Lovell's Athletic F.C. players
Hereford United F.C. players
Cheltenham Town F.C. players
English Football League players
Association football central defenders